The Ukwuani people (also called Ndokwa people are a subgroup of the Igbo people located in the southern part of Nigeria in the western part of the Niger Delta and other areas.

Origin
Their origin is debated, with the narrative being that they are from Igbo and Benin. This has been challenged by Paul O. Opone, a lecturer at Delta State University, Abraka who argues that the evidence shows that they are of Igbo origin.

Ndokwa people
Buchi (Nigerian comedian)
Enebeli Elebuwa (Nollywood actor/producer
Uti Nwachukwu (Model/actor, Winner Big Brother Africa III, 2008)
Peter Odili (Former Executive Governor Of Rivers State, Ndoni, http://www.ndoniusa.org/history-of-ndoni.html)
Sunday Oliseh (Nigerian Footballer)
Patrick Osakwe (Politician/ Former Senator, Federal Republic of Nigeria)
Friday Osanebi (Deputy Speaker, Delta State House Of Assembly)
Emeka Ossai (Nollywood actor/producer/model)

References

External links 
 Ethnologue entry

Languages of Nigeria
Igboid languages
Local Government Areas in Delta State